Hoseynaliabad (also Romanized as Ḩoseyn‘alīābād) is a village in Dadin Rural District, Jereh and Baladeh District, Kazerun County, Fars Province, Iran. At the 2006 census, its population consisted of 9 families with a total of 38 people.

References 

Populated places in Kazerun County